Dorothy Alexander may refer to:

Dottie Alexander (born 1972), keyboardist
Dorothy Bohm (born 1924), photographer who used the name Dorothy Alexander
Dorothy Alexander (dancer), founder of the precursor of Atlanta Ballet
Dorothy Alexander (tennis), see 1931 in tennis